John Rogers (25 September 1930 – 26 March 2016) was an Australian rower. He competed in the men's double sculls event at the 1952 Summer Olympics.

References

1930 births
2016 deaths
Australian male rowers
Olympic rowers of Australia
Rowers at the 1952 Summer Olympics
Place of birth missing
20th-century Australian people